Coumans is a surname. Notable people with the surname include:

 André Coumans (1893–1958), Belgian horse rider
 Hans Coumans (1943–1986), Dutch painter
 Theo Coumans, Dutch drummer, member of Pussycat (band)
 Thomas Coumans (born 1984), Belgian actor